Highway M23 is one of the shortest Ukrainian international highway (M-highway) which connects Berehove with Khust and runs in the southern portion of the region next to the Hungarian and Romanian borders.  From Berehove to the little settlement of Vylok, the M23 is part of European route E58 and European route E81 which drift of towards the Romanian border at the border checkpoint Okli on a regional route.

Route

See also

 Roads in Ukraine
 Ukraine Highways
 International E-road network
 Pan-European corridors

References

External links
 International Roads in Ukraine in Russian
 European Roads in Russian

Roads in Zakarpattia Oblast